The 2012 United Football League was the third season of the UFL since its establishment as a semi-professional league in 2009. Global FC won their first Division 1 league title on goal difference against runners-up Kaya, after a 1–1 draw with third-placers Loyola Meralco Sparks on 26 June 2012. Pachanga won the Division 2 league title after being unbeaten in all its matches.

Teams
Seven new clubs entered the league after the successful third season of UFL Cup. Manila Nomads, Stallion and Pasargad was promoted to 2012 UFL Division 1 after they reached the knockout stage of 2011 UFL Cup. The season opened on January 14, 2012, and ended on June 30, 2012.

Clubs by division

Division 1

Division 2

Venues

Division 1

Division 2

League tables

Division 1

Division 2

Results

Division 1

Division 2

Top goalscorers

Division 1

Division 2

Correct as of 20:30, 30 June 2012
Source: UFL Phil

Season Awards

Team Awards
The following teams are awarded by the United Football League in the ceremony.

Division 1

Division 2

Individual awards
The following players are awarded by the United Football League Committee in the ceremony.

Division 1

Division 2

References

 
United Football League (Philippines) seasons
1
Phil
Phil